BBC Newsroom Live is a news and current affairs programme broadcast on the BBC News Channel and BBC Two. It is broadcast from 11:00-13:00 and is followed by the BBC News at One usually with Sophie Raworth or Kate Silverton. The first programme was broadcast on the BBC News Channel on 21 March 2016 presented by Joanna Gosling. The main presenters include Gosling, Annita McVeigh and formerly Carrie Gracie. The programme's motto is "Stay up to date on the day's top stories, with the latest breaking news as it happens." During the COVID-19 pandemic, Joanna Gosling presented Monday-Wednesday with Martine Croxall presenting Thursday-Friday but other presenters presented as relief. The programme no longer carries the name Newsroom Live or the branding during the pandemic but is presented as generic BBC World News content. On Saturday 24th April 2021, the BBC rolled out a new repetitive presenting rota for the newsreaders - lasting for 4 weeks before it starts again.

Presenters 

Relief presenters include Kasia Madera, Tim Wilcox, Geeta Guru-Murthy, Luxmy Gopal, Martine Croxall, Ben Thompson and Lukwesa Burak.

Former presenters 
Maxine Mawhinney (relief 2016-2017)

Carrie Gracie (2016-2020)

References

External links
 

2016 British television series debuts
2020s British television series
BBC News
BBC television news shows